The Hospital and Free School of King Charles II, Oxmantown, also called The King's Hospital (KH) is a Church of Ireland co-educational independent day and boarding school situated in Palmerstown, Dublin, Ireland. It is on an 80-acre campus beside the River Liffey, called Brooklawn, named after the country houses situated on the site and in which the headmaster and his family reside. The school is also a member of the HMC Headmasters' and Headmistresses' Conference and the BSA.

Founded in 1669, it is one of the oldest schools in Ireland and was also known as the Blue Coat School. Although priority is given to those of the main Protestant tradition, as a Christian school, it is attended by students of other denominations and faiths. The school's colours are navy and gold. The school crest is three burning castles with the date "1669", almost identical to the crest for Dublin city. The current headmaster is Mark Ronan.

History

Founding

The school was founded in 1669 as The Hospital and Free School of King Charles II and was located in Queen Street, Dublin. King's Hospital was a continuation of the old Free School of Dublin. On 5 May 1674, the school opened with 60 pupils, including 3 girls. From 1783 to 1971, the school was located in Blackhall Place, Dublin, currently the headquarters of the Law Society of Ireland.

During the early seventeenth and early eighteenth centuries it was used as the site of elections to the Irish Parliament's Dublin City. When this was changed to the Tholsel for the 1713 general election, it led to the Dublin election riot.

Morgan's takeover
The take-over of Morgan's School (1957) contributed to steadily increasing numbers of students, and by 1970, a need for extra space and facilities led to the move from the city centre to a modern purpose-built school set in its own  site on the banks of the River Liffey in Palmerstown, County Dublin.

Erwin Schrödinger
A 57-year-old manuscript by the Nobel Prize in Physics winning physicist Erwin Schrödinger resurfaced at the school in 2012. Entitled "Fragment From An Unpublished Dialogue Of Galileo", it was written for the School's 1955 edition of the annual Blue Coat magazine to coincide with Schrödinger leaving Dublin to take up his appointment as Chair of Physics at the University of Vienna. Schrödinger wrote the manuscript for the school's former English teacher and Editor of the Blue Coat magazine, Ronnie Anderson (now deceased), a friend of Schrödinger when he lived in Dublin. It is now in the possession of King's Hospital alumnus Professor Jonathan Coleman in CRANN at Trinity College, Dublin.

Structure
The school is co-educational and caters for some 720 pupils, roughly 440 day pupils and 280 boarders in 2018/19. The King's Hospital has students from all over Ireland and from overseas. Students from Germany and Spain are the most common international students.

The School is divided into five boarding houses: Bluecoat, Mercer, Grace, Morgan and Ormonde and five day pupil houses. Each boarding house has its own resident housemaster or housemistress.

Sport

The school has a gymnasium and sports hall with an advanced fitness center. The school also has access to a swimming pool, grass hockey pitch, rugby pitches and tennis courts.

Various sports (with a focus on rugby) are played on campus and training is provided by staff. The school has teams for rugby, hockey, cricket, athletics, cross-country, badminton, soccer, basketball and swimming.

Notable past pupils

Jack Boothman - President of the GAA (1994 and 1997);	
 Jonathan Coleman (physicist), lecturer in the School of Physics in CRANN at Trinity College Dublin and the 2011 Science Foundation Ireland 'Researcher of the Year'
Natalya Coyle is an Irish athlete who competed for Ireland at the 2012 Summer Olympics London 2012 where she finished 9th in the modern pentathlon.
 Harvey du Cros - financier; the founder of the pneumatic tire industry based on the discovery of John Boyd Dunlop
 Robert Dowds - politician; a former Irish Labour Party politician who served as a Teachta Dála (TD) for the Dublin Mid-West constituency from 2011 to 2016.
 Ian Fitzpatrick - Rugby player, domestically as a full back for Leinster and internationally as a forward for the Irish rugby sevens side.
John and Edward Grimes - members of the pop duo Jedward
Lisa Hannigan - Irish folk/pop singer famous for her recordings with Damien Rice
Niall Hogan - co-founder of Touchtech Payments, bought by billion dollar online global payments company Stripe in 2019 
Heike Holstein - is the most successful ever dressage rider based in Ireland and was a three times competitor equestrianism at the Olympics in Equestrian at the 2004 Summer Olympics – Individual dressage Atlanta 1996, Sydney 2000 and Athens 2004.
Noel Mahony - First-class cricketer for Ireland and president of the Irish Cricket Union, also taught mathematics at the school.
Angus McKeen - Former Leinster and Ireland rugby prop forward;
Tom Murphy - Tony Award-winning Irish actor;
Carlos O'Connell Irish athlete, who competed in the 1988 Olympic Games.Irish record holder for the decathlon.
Roderic O'Gorman - Cllr and Chairman of The Green Party (Ireland)
Andy Orr - member of the pop group Six
Randal Plunkett, 21st Baron of Dunsany - film producer
Judy Reynolds, Irish Olympic dressage rider
Robin Roe - captain of the Ireland national rugby union team. Also capped with The Lions and The Barbarians;
Camilla Speirs - competed in equestrianism for Ireland at the 2012 Summer Olympics London 2012 Summer Olympics;
Kathryn Thomas - Irish television presenter;
Leo Varadkar - 14th Taoiseach of Ireland (2017–2020);
Robert Alexander Warke (born 1930), Bishop of Cork, Cloyne and Ross;
John Weir - Loyalist murderer and member of the Glenanne gang;
Denise Chaila is an Irish and Zambian rapper, singer, poet, grime and hip hop artist based in Limerick

Notable headmasters
1922–1927: John Mason Harden

References

External links
 The King's Hospital website
 The King's Hospital Past Pupil Union website

Secondary schools in South Dublin (county)
Educational institutions established in the 1660s
Boarding schools in Ireland
Private schools in the Republic of Ireland
Anglican schools in the Republic of Ireland
Bluecoat schools
1669 establishments in the British Empire